Gábor Torma (born 1 August 1976 in Dunaújváros) is a Hungarian former football player.

Career
Torma started his career at Dunaferr SE, from where he was signed by Cercle Brugge in 1994 to replace Belgian international Josip Weber. He spent three years at the club, and in the 1996–97 season he became the top goalscorer of the team.

Due to his exceptional club performance he was called up to the Hungarian national team in 1996, where he gained seven caps but scored no goals. After János Csank's resignation in late 1997 he was never called up to the team again.

In 1997, he signed for Dutch side Roda JC, and spent the next seven seasons in the Eredivisie, also playing for FC Groningen, ADO Den Haag and RKC Waalwijk. However, he could not any more reach the level of his performances with Brugge, and in 2004 he left the Netherlands for AEL Limassol in Cyprus.

In 2005, he returned to Hungary and played a while for ZTE, before moving to REAC.

Honours
 Belgian Cup:   Runner-up: 1996 
 KNVB Cup:   Winner: 2000

References
Belgian Cup profile
Dutch Cup profile

External links
 
 HLSZ profile

1976 births
Living people
Sportspeople from Dunaújváros
Hungarian footballers
Zalaegerszegi TE players
Rákospalotai EAC footballers
Cercle Brugge K.S.V. players
Roda JC Kerkrade players
FC Groningen players
ADO Den Haag players
RKC Waalwijk players
AEL Limassol players
Association football forwards
Hungary international footballers
Eredivisie players
Belgian Pro League players
Cypriot First Division players
Hungarian expatriate footballers
Expatriate footballers in Cyprus
Expatriate footballers in Belgium
Expatriate footballers in the Netherlands
Hungarian expatriate sportspeople in Cyprus
Hungarian expatriate sportspeople in Belgium
Hungarian expatriate sportspeople in the Netherlands
Dunaújváros FC players